WJBC (1230 kHz) is a commercial AM radio station licensed to Bloomington, Illinois, and serving the Bloomington-Normal region.  It broadcasts a news/talk radio format and is owned by Cumulus Media, part of a five-station cluster. It has four full-time news anchors and two part-time reporters.   The station calls itself "The Voice of Central Illinois".

WJBC is powered at 1,000 watts, using a non-directional antenna.  The transmitter is on Greenwood Avenue at West Hamilton Road in Bloomington.  Programming is also heard on 50-watt FM translator W271DC at 102.1 MHz.

Programming

Talk
WJBC is live and local 6am to 6pm weekdays.  In morning drive time, Scott Miller is heard.  In middays, Neil Doyle and Illinois RFD hosts.  12:30pm – 3:00pm: Todd Wineburner, 3:00pm – 4:00pm: RFD Profit Watch, 4:00pm – 6:00pm: Blake Haas, 6:00pm – 9:00pm: John Batchelor, 9:00pm – Midnight: American Stories "[Midnight – 4:00am][Coast to Coast AM]] with George Noory" and 4:00am – 5:00am:First Light."

On weekends, WJBC has shows on home repair, real estate, technology and travel.  Weekend hosts include Kim Komando and Chris Plante.  Most hours begin with CBS Radio News. A station staff supplies local news, sports and agricultural reports.

Sports
WJBC has been the longtime home to the Illinois State Redbirds, as well as local high school sports.  It also carries Chicago Bears football and St. Louis Cardinals baseball.  On occasion, WJBC has also broadcast the Central Illinois Flying Aces and the Bloomington Edge.

History

Early Years
The station was first licensed on April 17, 1925, to the Hummer Furniture Store at Second and Joliet streets in La Salle, Illinois. It was initially powered at 100 watts on 1280 kHz. The WJBC call sign was randomly assigned from a sequential roster of available call letters. However, for a while the station adopted the mnemonic slogan "Where Jazz Becomes Classic".  The station later moved from the Hummer store to the Kaskaskia Hotel.  During the years in La Salle, it moved to 1320 kHz, then 1200 kHz.

Move to Bloomington
The Great Depression eventually closed both the companies backing the station in LaSalle, and the owner of Hummer Furniture owner moved the station to Bloomington-Normal.

Malcolm Magregor bought WJBC from Kaskaskia Broadcasting Company effective April 1, 1933. At that time, WJBC was still a 100-watt station, sharing time with WJBL in Decatur, Illinois.

New Facilities
On September 11, 1934, WJBC began transmitting from its new facilities, making it the first radio station in Bloomington.  The transmitter was in Normal and its main studio was at Illinois Wesleyan University in Bloomington.  Other studios were at Illinois State Normal School and the Illinois Farm Bureau.  At first it was only on the air a few hours a day, with eight daily newscasts, weather twice a day, and the Western Union time announced at the top of each hour.

For much of the 1940s and 50s, WJBC was first an NBC Blue Network affiliate, then an ABC Radio Network affiliate.  It carried a line up of dramas, comedies, news, sports and other programs during the "Golden Age of Radio."  It was owned by the Bloomington Broadcasting Company, which also put an FM station on the air in 1947, 101.5 WJBC-FM (now WBNQ).  The two stations mostly simulcast for the FM station's first two decades on the air.

Rev. R.J. Zehr
On the morning of August 25, 1971, the station broadcast the last radio program of the Reverend R.J. Zehr, who died later that morning. Zehr's first broadcast on the station was on a Sunday in October 1934; shortly thereafter, he was given a daily slot, which he continued - without missing a day - until the mid-1960s.

Almost all of Zehr's broadcasts were live, not prerecorded. In 1949, he began doing the program from his house, via telephone.  His program's time slot varied over the years, but normally aired between 5:00 a.m. and 6:30 a.m., and lasted 15 to 30 minutes.

The audio tape cartridge machine, which fundamentally changed the way radio stations played commercials and music on air, was developed at WJBC in 1959. Ted Bailey (then Chief Engineer of WJBC) and staff engineer Jack Jenkins developed the ATC (Automatic Tape Control) machine. A joint patent was granted to Bailey, Jenkins and Nolte (station manager of WJBC) as inventors.

Cumulus Media
On April 30, 2012, Townsquare Media announced that it was selling the station to Cumulus Media. The assignment of the station's license to Cumulus was consummated on July 31, 2012.

In 2005, and again in 2009, the station won the Marconi Award from the National Association of Broadcasters for Best Small Market Radio Station in the United States.  WJBC has won several Edward R. Murrow Awards for its local news coverage, as well as several Illinois Silver Dome Awards.

Personalities

Current
Neil Doyle
Blake Haas
Jake Fogal
A.J. Harris
Scott Miller
Todd Wineburner
A.J. Harris
Andrew Cohen
Eric Lapan

Former
Denny Adkins
Bob Arya
Bones Bach
Marla Behrends
Ken Behrens
Nancy Blair
Keith Blankenship
Mike Bradd
Chris Brathwaite
Dara Brockmeier
Jim Browne
Adam "Cha-Cha" Chandler
Jim Cheney
Craig Collins
Elizabeth Estes Cooper
Sarah Curtis
L.A. Decker
Ryan Denham
Mark Dennis
Zach Dietmeier
Paul Dunn
Jim Durham
Karen Erks
John Fitzgerald
Jim Fitzpatrick
Keith Gottschalk
Lee Hall
TJ Hart
Cameron D. James
Terry James
Mark Johnson
Rob Kass
Willis Kern
Art Kimball
Scott Laughlin
Tim Lewis
Dick Luedke 
Gene Lyle
Stacy Marshall
R.C. McBride
Nick McClintock
Amy Meyer
Paul Morello
Don Munson
Katherine Murphy 
Lori Nelson
Don Newberg
Adam Nielsen
Royal Norman
Don Norton
Howard Packowitz
Zach Parcell
Stephanie Pawlowski
Patti Penn
L.P. Phillips
Red Pitcher
Joe Ragusa
Colleen Reynolds
Scott Robbins
Daune Robinson
Chris Rongey
Ron Ross
Scott Ross
Stew Salowitz
Jim Sauers
J.D. Scott
Art Sechrest
Alan Sender
Harvey J. Steele
Adam Studzinski
Dan Swaney
Dick Templeton
Steve Vogel
Bill Walberg
Beth Whisman
Larry Whittaker
Todd Wineburner
Lyle Wood

References

External links
WJBC.com — official website

JBC
LaSalle County, Illinois
News and talk radio stations in the United States
Radio stations established in 1925
Cumulus Media radio stations